The following is a list of charter schools in Connecticut grouped by county.

Fairfield County

Achievement First Bridgeport Academy
 The Bridge Academy
Capital Preparatory Harbor School
Great Oaks Charter School Bridgeport
 New Beginnings Family Academy
Park City Prep Charter School
Side by Side Charter School
Stamford Charter School for Excellence

Hartford County

Achievement First Hartford Academy
Jumoke Academy
Odyssey Community School

Litchfield County
Explorations Charter School

New Haven County

Amistad Academy
Booker T. Washington Academy
Brass City Charter School
Common Ground High School
Elm City College Preparatory School
 Elm City Montessori Charter School
Highville Charter School

New London County

Integrated Day Charter School
Interdistrict School for Arts & Communication

Windham County
Path Academy School District

References

Charter